Nayakulaku Saval is a 1984 Indian Telugu action drama film produced by P. Padmanabham, directed by K. S. R. Das starring Krishna Ghattamaneni, Jaya Prada and Sumalatha in the lead roles. The film has musical score by Chellapilla Satyam.

Cast 
 Krishna Ghattamaneni
 Jaya Prada
 Sumalatha
 Allu Ramalingaiah
 Nagabhushanam
 Prabhakar Reddy
 Giribabu
 Kaikala Satyanarayana
Jyothi Lakshmi
Jayamalini
Raavi Kondala Rao
P.L. Narayana
Radha Kumari
Pushpa Kumari

Soundtrack

References

External links 

1984 films
1984 action films
1980s Telugu-language films
Indian action films
Films scored by Satyam (composer)